Oberkampf may refer to:

 Christophe-Philippe Oberkampf, a French industrialist of German origin
 a street in Paris, Rue Oberkampf, 11th arrondissement of Paris, and its surrounding area
 a Paris metro station, see Oberkampf (Paris Metro)
 a French rock band, see Oberkampf (band)